Tinpo (Japanese: ポータウンのなかまたち), (Welsh: Tîmpo) is a children's animated television series produced by Cloudco Entertainment, Dentsu, Sprite Animation Studios, OLM Digital and TV Tokyo for CBeebies.

The series originally ran as 1-minute online shorts on both CBS' KEWLopolis block as well as on The Hub.

The series began airing on TVOKids in Canada on 3 June 2019.

Premise 
The show features four colourful human-like creatures called The Team Tinpo, who fix problems with creative solutions.

Characters 
 Tinpo: a blue member of Team Tinpo. He’s the leader. A dreamer and a doer. He is voiced by Ross Grant.
 Dougpo: a yellow member of Team Tinpo. She boldly acts on gut and instinct. She is voiced by Lizzie Waterworth-Santo.
 Logipo: a reddish-orange member of Team Tinpo. He’s cautious and by the book. He is voiced by Keith Wickham.
 Hackpo: a purple member of Team Tinpo. She heads up communication and invents gadgets. She is voiced by Joanna Ruiz.
 Herman: the pet hamster of Tinpo. He has his own hamster ball and bag. 
 Finn: the pet fish of Logipo. She has her own fish ball.

other in 2007
 Frek: a blueish po. He has a number one on his back. who has ideas. He can fix thing and make things.
 Duxx: a orange po. She has a number two on her back. who is up to something and she is shut a genius.
 Sync: a blackish po. He is a child-like. He has a number three on his back and he is not a boss.
 Seeb: a greenish po. He has a number four on his back and he is a elf-like and he is clumsy.
 Trey: a red po. She has a number five on her back and she don't have a mouth and she cannot talk.

Production 
The shorts were produced by American Greetings Entertainment (now Cloudco Entertainment).

The TV series was produced for CBeebies by Cloudco Entertainment in association with Dentsu, Sprite Entertainment, OLM Digital, and TV Tokyo.

Lemonsky Studios provided additional outsourced service on the animation.

References 

2007 British television series debuts
2018 British television series debuts
British children's animated adventure television series
British preschool education television series
CBeebies
Animated preschool education television series
2000s preschool education television series
2010s preschool education television series